Cascade AIDS Project (CAP) is a nonprofit organization based in Portland, Oregon, in the United States. Its mission is to prevent HIV infections, to "support and empower" people affected and by HIV/AIDS, and to eliminate stigma associated with the disease. Founded in 1983 and incorporated two years later, CAP is the "oldest and largest community-based provider of HIV services, housing, education and advocacy" in Oregon and Southwest Washington.

In 2017, Prism Health opened as an extension of CAP.

References

External links

 
 
 Cascade AIDS Project (CAP) at Portland State University (University Studies: Senior Capstone)
 Steve Duin blog: The Cascade AIDS Project responds by Steven Duin (March 26, 2014), The Oregonian

1983 establishments in Oregon
Charities based in Oregon
HIV/AIDS organizations in the United States
LGBT in Oregon
Organizations based in Portland, Oregon
Organizations established in 1983